The Woman in Red: Original Motion Picture Soundtrack is the second soundtrack album released by American musician Stevie Wonder on the Motown label. Also featuring Dionne Warwick, the album was released in 1984 for the film of the same name (starring Gene Wilder). It features Wonder's biggest hit, "I Just Called to Say I Love You", which hit number one internationally and won the Academy Award for Best Original Song, and also features the follow-up hit, "Love Light in Flight" (a US top-20 hit) and "Don't Drive Drunk", the song and the accompanying music video for which were used in the Ad Council and the US Department of Transportation's Drunk Driving Prevention public service announcement the following year.

Track listing
All songs written by Stevie Wonder, except "It's More Than You" by Ben Bridges.

Side one
"The Woman in Red" – 4:38
"It's You" (featuring Dionne Warwick) – 4:56
"It's More Than You" (instrumental) – 3:15
"I Just Called to Say I Love You" – 6:17
Side two
"Love Light in Flight" – 6:54
"Moments Aren't Moments" (Solo by Dionne Warwick) – 4:33
"Weakness" (with Dionne Warwick) – 4:13
"Don't Drive Drunk" – 6:33

Note: Later pressings of the compact disc have the radio edit of "I Just Called to Say I Love You", due to its popularity.

Personnel

Stevie Wonder – piano, synthesizers, drums, harmonica, vocoder, lead vocals, backing vocals (1–5, 7–8) 
Dionne Warwick – lead vocals (2, 6-7)
Nathan Watts – bass guitar (2-3,7)
James Allen – drums (2,7)
Isaiah Sanders – piano, synthesizer, drums (3,7)
Ben Bridges – electric guitar (3)
Lenny Castro – congas (5)
Larry Gittens – trumpet (6)
Bob Malach – saxophone (7)

Commercial performance
The album reached number four on the US Billboard 200 chart, number one on the R&B Albums chart (for four weeks) and number two on the UK Albums Chart, where it was kept off the top spot by the albums Now That's What I Call Music 3 and David Bowie's Tonight. Wonder's albums Songs in the Key of Life and Hotter than July also reached number two in the UK and to date he has failed to achieve a number-one album there. However, the single "I Just Called to Say I Love You", taken from The Woman in Red, was a massive hit in the UK, reaching number one and becoming the second best-selling single of 1984 (only behind Band Aid's "Do They Know It's Christmas?") and the third most successful single of the entire 1980s there.

Charts

Weekly charts

Year-end charts

Certifications and sales

Accolades

See also
List of number-one R&B albums of 1984 (U.S.)

References

	

Comedy film soundtracks
1984 soundtrack albums
Stevie Wonder soundtracks
Motown soundtracks
Albums produced by Stevie Wonder